Eunicea is a genus of gorgonian-type octocorals in the family Plexauridae. These branched octocorals typically have knobby protuberances from which the polyps protrude. They are often stiffened by purple sclerites and some colonies, in brightly lit back-reef areas are purple, though most colonies are brown or grey. The polyps in some species are large and feathery in appearance. The growth of these corals is rapid and they can be kept in a reef aquarium.

Species
The World Register of Marine Species lists these species:

Eunicea aspera Duchassaing & Michelotti, 1860
Eunicea asperula Milne Edwards & Haime, 1857
Eunicea calyculata (Ellis & Solander, 1786)
Eunicea castelnaudi Milne Edwards & Haime, 1857
Eunicea citrina Valenciennes, 1855
Eunicea clavigera Bayer, 1961
Eunicea distans Duchassaing & Michelotti, 1860
Eunicea echinata Valenciennes, 1855
Eunicea esperi Duchassaing & Michelotti, 1860
Eunicea flexuosa (Lamouroux, 1821)
Eunicea fusca Duchassaing & Michelotti, 1860
Eunicea gracilis Valenciennes, 1855
Eunicea heteropora (Lamarck, 1816)
Eunicea hicksoni Stiasny, 1935
Eunicea hirta Duchassaing & Michelotti, 1860
Eunicea humilis Milne Edwards, 1857
Eunicea inexpectata Stiasny, 1939

Eunicea knighti Bayer, 1961
Eunicea laciniata Duchassaing & Michelotti, 1860
Eunicea laxispica (Lamarck, 1815)
Eunicea lugubris Duchassaing & Michelotti, 1860
Eunicea madrepora (Dana, 1846)
Eunicea mammosa Lamouroux, 1816
Eunicea multicauda (Lamarck, 1816)
Eunicea pallida Garcia Parrado & Alcolado, 1996
Eunicea palmeri Bayer, 1961
Eunicea pinta Bayer & Deichmann, 1958
Eunicea sayoti Duchassaing & Michelotti, 1860
Eunicea sparsiflora Kunze, 1916
Eunicea stromyeri Duchassaing & Michelotti, 1860
Eunicea succinea (Pallas, 1766)
Eunicea tayrona Sánchez, 2009
Eunicea tourneforti Milne Edwards & Haime, 1857
Eunicea turgida Ehrenberg, 1834

References

Plexauridae
Octocorallia genera